Notebook is a Nepali romance film directed by Yogesh Ghimire and produced by Joshi Pragya for Pragya Films, starring Jiwan Luitel , Shen Sapkota, Neeta Dhungana, Sushma Karki, Sunil Thapa, Dhruba Koirala, Laya Sangraula, Sashita Phuyal, and Pavitra Adhikari.

References

Nepalese romantic comedy films
Films shot in Kathmandu
Films shot in Ilam